St David's College is the name of several colleges. Most St David's Colleges are named after Saint David, patron saint of Wales:  

 St David's College, Lampeter, the original name of the University of Wales, Lampeter (now University of Wales, Trinity Saint David)
 St David's College, Llandudno, an independent day and boarding school in Llandudno, Wales
 St David's Catholic College, a Roman Catholic sixth form college in Cardiff, Wales
 St David's Prep, informal name for St David's College, an independent day school in West Wickham, southeast London

See also
 St. David's School (disambiguation)